The 1886 Blackpool by-election was held on 20 August 1886 after the incumbent Conservative MP Frederick Stanley was elevated to the House of Lords and thus had to resign his seat in the House of Commons of the United Kingdom.  The seat was won by the Conservative candidate Sir Matthew Ridley.

References 

By-elections to the Parliament of the United Kingdom in Lancashire constituencies
1886 elections in the United Kingdom
August 1886 events